Dr. Chetput Venkatasubban Seshadri (14 April 1930 – 17 September 1995) was a distinguished Indian chemical engineer. He has received his PhD from Carnegie Mellon University, Pittsburgh. He was then at Massachusetts Institute of Technology as a Research Associate. He started his independent academic career as an Assistant Professor of IIT Kanpur in 1965. Later he became a Professor and finally the Head of the Chemical Engineering Department of IITK. He also served as the Dean of Students Affairs at IITK.

He was the founding director of the Shri AMM Murugappa Chettiar Research Centre. During his tenure as a director, this Research Center won Jamnalal Bajaj Award for Application of Science and Technology for Rural Development in 1981.

In 2008, the C. V. Seshadri chair of professorship was instituted at the Indian Institute of Technology Kanpur. Prof. Yogesh M. Joshi is the present occupant of this chair.

References

External links
 Shri A M M Murugappa Chettiar Research Centre, Chennai

Kanpur
Carnegie Mellon University alumni
1995 deaths
1930 births
Indian chemical engineers
Academic staff of IIT Kanpur